Who Are You Now? is the third full-length studio album by alternative rock band This Providence, released on March 17, 2009. The album title comes from the song "Playing the Villain", the album's eleventh track.

Background
The album is the band's first full-length album after the departure of bassist Phil Cobrea, drummer Ryan Tapert, and guitarist Sean Gasperetti, and the addition of bassist David Blaise and drummer Andy Horst. The album was recorded at The Lair in Los Angeles. The album's release received support from Paramore, Travie McCoy of Gym Class Heroes, Matt MacDonald of The Classic Crime, and others in a YouTube video uploaded by the band's label Fueled by Ramen.

Music videos were released for the tracks "Letdown" and "Keeping on Without You".

Critical reception
MTV News commented on the album's second track, "Letdown", calling it a "fist-pumper of an anthem" with "frenzied overlapping bridges and orgasmic choruses", but did not give a further review of the album as a whole.

Track listing

Personnel 
 Dan Young – vocals
 Gavin Phillips – guitar
 David Blaise – bass
 Andy Horst – drums
 Paul Dutton – strings arrangement (on "Chasing the Wind")
 Thomas Patton III - vocals, noise (on "Chasing the Wind")
 Produced, recorded, and mixed by Matt Squire
 Mastered by UE Natasi at Sterling Sound

Charts

Notes

References 

2009 albums
This Providence albums
Albums produced by Matt Squire
Fueled by Ramen albums